Vilac is a locality and decentralized municipal entity located in the municipality of Vielha e Mijaran, in Province of Lleida province, Catalonia, Spain. As of 2020, it has a population of 223.

Geography 
Vilac is located 165km north of Lleida.

References

Populated places in the Province of Lleida